FVA may refer to:
 Factor Va (FVa), a protein
  Flux variability analysis
 Fernando von Arb (born 1963), Swiss guitarist
 Ferrari Virtual Academy, a video game
 Festival Voix d'Amériques, held annually in Montreal, Canada
 Flugwissenschaftliche Vereinigung Aachen, a German aviation research group and aircraft manufacturer
 Florida Velodrome Association, a non-profit cycling organization
 Footvolley Australia
  Four Valve type A - one of the Formula 2 engines developed by Cosworth
 Fox Valley Association
 Function value analysis
 Funding Valuation Adjustment - one of the  X-Value Adjustments in relation to derivative instruments held by banks
 Venezuelan Athletics Federation